Ficus velutina is a species of plant in the family Moraceae. It is found in Brazil and Costa Rica.

References

velutina
Least concern plants
Taxonomy articles created by Polbot